Alfred Cook may refer to:

 Alfred Bramwell Cook (1903–1994), New Zealand Salvation Army leader and doctor
 Alfred M. Cook (1850–1921),  American farmer, businessman, and politician in Wisconsin